Coneweb spiders (Diguetidae) are six-eyed haplogyne spiders that live in tangled space webs, fashioning a cone-like central retreat where they hide and lay eggs. It is a small family, containing only two genera with fifteen species and is confined to the New World, preferring deserts. Members of the genus Diguetia usually build their webs in shrubs or between cactus pads. They have the same eye arrangement as the venomous recluse spiders (family Sicariidae), but none are known to be harmful to humans.

Taxonomy
The group was first created by F. O. Pickard-Cambridge in 1899 as the subfamily Diguetiinae of the family Scytodidae. It was raised to the rank of family by Willis J. Gertsch using the spelling "Diguetidae". Pickard-Cambridge's use of double "i" is correct according to Article 29.3 of the International Code of Zoological Nomenclature, since the name is based on the genus Diguetia. In 2004, Jörg Wonderlich suggested reducing it again to a subfamily, this time of Plectreuridae. However, it is still sometimes considered a subfamily of the Plectreuridae.

Genera and species

, the World Spider Catalog accepts the following genera:

Diguetia
Diguetia Simon, 1895
Diguetia albolineata (O. Pickard-Cambridge, 1895) — USA, Mexico
Diguetia andersoni Gertsch, 1958 — USA
Diguetia canities (McCook, 1890) — USA, Mexico
Diguetia canities dialectica Chamberlin, 1924 — Mexico
Diguetia canities mulaiki Gertsch, 1958 — USA
Diguetia catamarquensis (Mello-Leitão, 1941) — Argentina
Diguetia imperiosa Gertsch & Mulaik, 1940 — USA, Mexico
Diguetia mojavea Gertsch, 1958 — USA
Diguetia propinqua (O. Pickard-Cambridge, 1896) — Mexico
Diguetia signata Gertsch, 1958 — USA, Mexico
Diguetia stridulans Chamberlin, 1924 — Mexico

Segestrioides
Segestrioides Keyserling, 1883
Segestrioides badia (Simon, 1903) – Brazil
Segestrioides bicolor Keyserling, 1883 (type species) – Peru
Segestrioides copiapo Platnick, 1989 – Chile
Segestrioides tofo Platnick, 1989 – Chile

See also
 List of Diguetidae species

References

 

Diguetidae
Taxa named by Frederick Octavius Pickard-Cambridge